Fence is a town in Florence County, Wisconsin, United States. The population was 231 at the 2000 census. The unincorporated community of Fence is located in the town.

Geography
According to the United States Census Bureau, the town has a total area of 90.0 square miles (233.2 km2), of which, 89.4 square miles (231.6 km2) of it is land and 0.6 square miles (1.5 km2) of it (0.66%) is water.

Demographics
As of the census of 2010, there were 207 people, 107 households, and 60 families residing in the town. The population density was 2.6 people per square mile (1.0/km2). There were 373 housing units at an average density of 4.2 per square mile (1.6/km2). The racial makeup of the town was 97.40% White, 0.43% African American, 1.30% Native American, 0.43% Asian, and 0.43% from two or more races. Hispanic or Latino of any race were 0.43% of the population.

There were 107 households, out of which 18.7% had children under the age of 18 living with them, 50.5% were married couples living together, 5.6% had a female householder with no husband present, and 43.0% were non-families. 35.5% of all households were made up of individuals, and 11.2% had someone living alone who was 65 years of age or older. The average household size was 2.16 and the average family size was 2.87.

In the town, the population was spread out, with 21.2% under the age of 18, 4.3% from 18 to 24, 29.4% from 25 to 44, 26.8% from 45 to 64, and 18.2% who were 65 years of age or older. The median age was 43 years. For every 100 females, there were 122.1 males. For every 100 females age 18 and over, there were 116.7 males.

The median income for a household in the town was $30,278, and the median income for a family was $35,250. Males had a median income of $31,023 versus $20,625 for females. The per capita income for the town was $15,169. About 7.7% of families and 13.3% of the population were below the poverty line, including 19.6% of those under the age of eighteen and 14.6% of those 65 or over.

References

Towns in Florence County, Wisconsin
Iron Mountain micropolitan area
Towns in Wisconsin